Tepidibacter  is a genus of Gram-positive bacteria in the family Clostridiaceae.

The type species of this genus is Tepidibacter thalassicus, a moderately thermophilic bacterial species isolated from deep-sea hydrothermal vents. Additional species within this genus have been identified.

References 

Gram-positive bacteria
Peptostreptococcaceae
Bacteria genera
Taxa described in 2003